Bree Despain (born 1979) is an American author.

Despain received her master's degree in Writing for Children and Young Adults from Vermont College of Fine Arts. She started writing full-time after being involved in a car accident and realizing that one of her deepest regrets would have been never finishing and publishing a book.

Despain is the author of the Dark Divine trilogy and the Into The Dark trilogy. Her first novel, The Dark Divine, was published in 2009, and the second, The Lost Saint, was published in December 2010. The Dark Divine series' main character is Grace Divine, a teenage girl who is the daughter of a pastor whose life is flipped once an old childhood friend, Daniel Kalbi, returns into her life. Despain's third and final installment to the Dark Divine series, The Savage Grace, was released on March 13, 2012. Her next novel, The Shadow Prince, is the first installment of her new Into The Dark series, which is described as a modern-day retelling of the Persephone/Hades and Orpheus/Eurydice myths.  The Eternity Key, book 2 in the Into The Dark trilogy released April 28, 2015, and book three was released in the fall of 2016 from Carol Rhoda Labs Press.

References

External links
 Bree Despain's official website
 
 

1979 births
Living people
21st-century American novelists
American fantasy writers
American women novelists
American writers of young adult literature
Place of birth missing (living people)
Women science fiction and fantasy writers
21st-century American women writers
Women writers of young adult literature